Howard Albert "Hopalong" Cassady (March 2, 1934 – September 20, 2019) was an American professional football player who was a halfback and split end.  He won the Heisman Trophy in 1955, and was inducted into the College Football Hall of Fame in 1979. He played professionally in the National Football League (NFL) for eight seasons, seven of them for the Detroit Lions, with whom he won the 1957 NFL Championship Game.

Early life
Cassady was born in Columbus, Ohio and attended the now closed Central High School.

College career
Cassady played football for the Ohio State Buckeyes from 1952 to 1955.  During his college career, he scored 37 touchdowns in 36 games.  He also played defensive back; a pass was never completed on him in his four years at the university.  He was twice selected as a consensus All-American, in 1954 and 1955.  The 1954 Buckeyes finished the season 10–0 and won a consensus national championship.  That year Cassady finished third in the vote for the Heisman Trophy, behind Alan Ameche of Wisconsin.  In 1955, he won the Heisman Trophy (by the largest margin at the time) and the Maxwell Award, and was named the Associated Press Athlete of the Year. During his playing days, he was 5'10" and 170 pounds.

Cassady earned the nickname "Hopalong" during his first game as a freshman for Ohio State.  Columbus sportswriters who saw him play said he "hopped all over the field like the performing cowboy", a reference to the fictional character Hopalong Cassidy.  In that game, Cassady came off the bench to score three touchdowns in a win over Indiana University.

During an Ohio State practice in 1953, Cassady was having trouble executing an off-tackle run.  At this point Coach Woody Hayes told Cassady to take a seat and brought in backup running back Robert Croce, who executed the play flawlessly and carried the ball for 20+ yards.  Hayes then told Cassady, "Cassady, did you see that Croce was just slow enough to hit the hole.  You're hitting the line too fast!"

Cassady held some Ohio State career records for many years following his graduation.  He held the career rushing record (2,466 yards) until it was surpassed by Jim Otis in 1969, the career all-purpose yards record (4,403 yards) until surpassed by Archie Griffin in 1974, and the scoring record (222 points) until surpassed by Pete Johnson in 1975.

Cassady also played baseball for Ohio State.  He led the team in home runs in 1955, and stolen bases in 1956.  He also became a member of the Sigma Chi fraternity there.

He was a member of The Pigskin Club Of Washington, D.C. National Intercollegiate All-American Football Players Honor Roll.

Professional career
Cassady played eight seasons in the National Football League: seven (1956-1961, and 1963) for the Detroit Lions, and one season (1962) split between the Cleveland Browns and the Philadelphia Eagles.  In the NFL he was an all-purpose back, playing both receiver and running back and scoring 27 career touchdowns.

After football
After retiring from football, Cassady became an entrepreneur forming a company manufacturing concrete pipe.  He then served as a scout for the New York Yankees baseball team, and as the first base coach for their former AAA affiliate, the Columbus Clippers.

His son Craig Cassady played defensive back at Ohio State, and briefly in the NFL for the New Orleans Saints in the 1970s. Cassady died on September 20, 2019, at his home in Tampa, Florida.

References

External links
 
 
 

1934 births
2019 deaths
American football halfbacks
Cleveland Browns players
Detroit Lions players
New York Yankees scouts
Philadelphia Eagles players
Ohio State Buckeyes baseball players
Ohio State Buckeyes football players
All-American college football players
College Football Hall of Fame inductees
Heisman Trophy winners
Maxwell Award winners
Baseball players from Columbus, Ohio
Players of American football from Columbus, Ohio